Chocontá is a municipality and town of Colombia in the Almeidas Province, part of the department of Cundinamarca. It is located on the Pan-American Highway. In 1938 Chocontá had a population of 2,041.

Etymology 
In the Chibcha language of the Muisca, Chocontá means: "Farmlands of the good ally" or "Garden of the neighbour".

History 
Chocontá is located in the territories of the Muisca on the border between the area led by the cacique of Vélez and the southern Muisca zipazgo reign. Around 1490 the armies of the northern Muisca led by Michuá and the warriors of the southern Muisca ruled by Saguamanchica confronted each other in the bloody Battle of Chocontá.

The Spanish conquistadors led by Gonzalo Jiménez de Quesada reached the Colombian highlands in 1537. On 9 June 1537, Pentecostal day, the Spanish arrived in Chocontá and Father Fray Domingo de las Casas named it Pueblo del Espíritu Santo ("Town of the Holy Spirit") with a mass. The village was founded by Tómas López on 6 September 1563 and relocated in 1573.

In 1854 the presidential headquarters was located in Chocontá and on 21 April 1854 Tomás de Herrera was proclaimed president in the rectory of the town. On 9 August 1819 at 2 pm liberator Simón Bolívar arrived to Chocontá and stayed to rest in what currently is the House of Culture after his triumph, defining the fate of the Colombian Republic.

Trivia 
 Chocontá is the principal producer of strawberries in Colombia
 The town is nicknamed La ciudad satélite de Colombia ("The satellite town of Colombia") because of the satellite dishes of Telecom
 The Sisga Reservoir is located within Chocontá
 The genus Choconta with species Choconta circulata, found near Bogotá, have been named after Chocontá

Gallery

References

External links 

 Government of Cundinamarca – Chocontá

Municipalities of Cundinamarca Department
Populated places established in 1563
1563 establishments in the Spanish Empire
Muysccubun